Akmal is both a given name and a surname. Notable people with the name include:

Given name:
Akmal Cheema, Pakistani politician
Akmal Irgashev (born 1982), Uzbekistani taekwondo practitioner
Akmal Khan (died 1967), Pakistani actor and singer
Akmal Kholmatov (born 1976), Tajikistani footballer
Akmal Rizal Ahmad Rakhli (born 1981), Malaysian footballer
Akmal Saburov (born 1987), Tajikistani footballer
Akmal Saleh (born 1964), Australian comedian and actor
Akmal Shaikh (1956–2009), British-Pakistani businessman
Akmal Shorakhmedov (born 1986), Uzbekistani footballer
Akmal Nazarov  (born 1985), Uzbekistani actor

Surname:
Adnan Akmal (born 1985), Pakistani cricketer
Kamran Akmal (born 1982), Pakistani cricketer
Umar Akmal (born 1990), Pakistani cricketer

Pakistani masculine given names
Urdu-language surnames
Punjabi-language surnames